Walter de Moravia (died c. 1263), Lord of Duffus, and Strathbrock, was a Scottish noble.

He was a younger son of Hugh de Moravia. His grandfather William had obtained a grant from King William I of Scotland, of the lands of Strathbrock in West Lothian, as well as Duffus in Moray, between 1165 and 1171. Walter inherited these lands upon the death of his father.

Walter married Euphemia, daughter of Fearchar, Earl of Ross. He was succeeded by his son Freskin.

Notes

References

12th-century Scottish people
13th-century Scottish people
12th-century births
Year of birth unknown
1260s deaths
Year of death uncertain
Moray
People associated with West Lothian
De Moravia family
Clan Murray